Hugh VI (c. 1039/1043 – 1102), called the Devilish, was the Lord of Lusignan and Count of La Marche (as Hugh I), the son and successor of Hugh V of Lusignan and Almodis de la Marche.

Despite his piety, Hugh was in constant conflict with the abbey of St. Maixent. On numerous occasions his disputes with the monks grew so violent that the duke of Aquitaine and the bishops of Poitiers and Saintes had to intercede. At one point, Pope Paschal II threatened Hugh with excommunication. From these conflicts Hugh was dubbed "le diable", the devilish, by the monks of St. Maixent.

In 1086 the Castilian army was destroyed at the Battle of Sagrajas by the Almoravids. Hugh's Catalan half-brother, Berenguer Ramon II, Count of Barcelona was threatened by the Almoravids. Hugh VI undertook an expedition to Spain in 1087 along with another half-brother, Raymond IV of Toulouse, to assist the count of Barcelona.

Hugh took the cross for the First Crusade, along with his brothers Raymond and Berenguer. He participated in the Crusade of 1101 and was killed at the battle of Ramla in 1102.

Marriage
Hugh married in c. 1065, Hildegarde of Thouars, daughter of Aimery IV of Thouars, Viscount of Thouars, and Aurengarde de Mauleon. They had:
Hugh VII of Lusignan

References

Sources

11th-century births
1102 deaths
Year of birth uncertain
Christians of the First Crusade
Christians of the Crusade of 1101
Counts of La Marche
House of Lusignan
11th-century French people
12th-century French people